Abdullah ibn Muhammad (January 11, 844 – October 15, 912) was the seventh Emir of Córdoba, reigning from 888 to 912 in Al-Andalus (Islamic Iberia).

Biography
Contemporary historians accused Abdullah of orchestrating the death of his half-brother, al-Mundhir, whereby he ascended to power.  This is unlikely, as ibn Muhammad showed very little interest in governing, becoming a neurotic recluse who was only interested in hunting and his faith.

The most formidable threat for the emir was Umar Ibn Hafsun, who had conquered the provinces of Reyyo (including  Bobastro),  Elvira (including Granada) and Jaén, and had allied with the populations of Archidona, Baeza, Úbeda and Priego. In 891 Ibn Hafsun was defeated near the castle of Polei and lost several cities. However, by the following year Ibn Hafsun had already recovered, and reconquered all the lost territories.

In 911, the emir signed a peace agreement with Ibn Hafsun. However, the war broke out again the following year, only to be halted by the death of Abdullah at Córdoba, who was improving his positions. The son he had designated as successor was killed by one of Abdullah's brothers. The latter was in turn executed by Abdullah's father, who named as successor Abd al-Rahman III, son of the killed son of Abdullah.

Family
Abdullah was the son of Muhammad I and the younger brother of al-Mundhir.

Around 863, Abdullah married Onneca Fortúnez, daughter of Fortún Garcés, King of Pamplona and his wife Aurea (Orea). She was repudiated sometime before 880 and returned to the Kingdom of Pamplona, most probably with her father who returned that year, and took her cousin Aznar Sánchez of Larraun as her second husband with whom she had at least three children, including Queen Toda of Navarre who was, therefore, the aunt of Abd al-Rahman III.

Abdullah had several children:
 Muhammed ibn Abd Allah (864 – 28 Jan 891). Recorded to be a son of Onneca.  He was murdered by his brother al-Mutarrif (with the approval of their father). He married a Basque or Frankish woman named Muzna. They were the parents of Abd al-Rahman III who was born three weeks after his father's death.
 al-Mutarrif, murdered in 895 after being accused of conspiracy.
 Aban
 al-Asi, executed in 921 after being accused of conspiracy.

References

Sources

 

844 births
912 deaths
People from Córdoba, Spain
Emirs of Córdoba
9th-century rulers in Europe
10th-century caliphs of Córdoba
9th-century Arabs
10th-century Arabs

id:Abdullah bin Muhammad